Abu'l-Qasim Ali ibn al-Hasan al-Kalbi, known to the Byzantine Greeks as Bolkasimos, was the third Emir of Sicily. He ruled from June 23, 970 to his death in battle on July 13, 982.

Background 
In 947, the Fatimid caliph al-Mansur bi-Nasr Allah sent al-Hasan ibn Ali al-Kalbi to subdue a revolt on Sicily, where he would go on to establish his own ruling dynasty, the Kalbids. Al-Hasan was succeeded by his son, Ahmad ibn al-Hasan al-Kalbi, in 954. In 969 Ahmad was recalled to North Africa to assist in subduing a revolt by Berber tribesmen. Briefly in 969, one of Ahmad's freed slaves, Ya'ish, was appointed governor of Sicily. The next year Abu'l-Qasim, Ahmad's brother, was elevated to governor.

Rule 
During the spring of 976, Abu'l-Qasim launched a raiding expedition on Byzantine Italy. His first target was the city of Messina, which he found deserted upon arrival. He soon moved on to Apulia, taking tribute from Cosenza before sending his brother to raid the surrounding countryside. He soon crossed the straits back to Sicily. During the summer of the same year, Abu'l-Qasim crossed back to mainland Italy, where he quickly forced tribute out of St. Agatha and took and razed Taranto. He then sent one army to Otranto while he besieged Gravina, before retiring to Muslim lands for the year, bringing home hundreds of captives as slaves.

In May 982, Abu'l-Qasim returned to Italy hoping to confront the advancing German emperor Otto II. Around Rossano Calabro, Abu'l-Qasim spotted the German army and realized that he had hugely underestimated its size. He attempted to retreat back to Sicily, but Otto caught up with him around Capo Colonna. In the Battle of Stilo, the outnumbered Kalbid force was able to surround and defeat the German forces with an unexpectedly strong cavalry charge; Otto himself only escaped by swimming to a Greek merchant ship, but Abu'l-Qasim was killed in the melee.

References

Sources 
 
 
 

982 deaths
10th-century Arabs
Fatimid people of the Arab–Byzantine wars
Emirs of Sicily
Kalbids
Military personnel killed in action
Year of birth unknown
Generals of the Fatimid Caliphate
Slave owners